Cambridge is a city in Washington County, Idaho, United States. The population was 328 at the 2010 census, down from 360 in 2000. It is the second largest city in the county, behind the significantly larger Weiser, the county seat.

Geography

Climate
Cambridge has a hot-summer mediterranean continental climate (Köppen climate classification Dsa), with cold, moist winters, gradual springs, hot and dry summers, and brief autumns. Yet because of the aridity, summer nights typically cool to below . Precipitation is usually infrequent and light, especially so during the summer months.

Demographics

2010 census
As of the census of 2010, there were 328 people, 151 households, and 100 families residing in the city. The racial makeup of the city was 98.2% White, 0.6% Native American, and 1.2% from two or more races. Hispanic or Latino of any race were 0.3% of the population.

There were 151 households, of which 25.2% had children under the age of 18 living with them, 52.3% were married couples living together, 8.6% had a female householder with no husband present, 5.3% had a male householder with no wife present, and 33.8% were non-families. 33.1% of all households were made up of individuals, and 14.5% had someone living alone who was 65 years of age or older. The average household size was 2.17 and the average family size was 2.68.

The median age in the city was 47.1 years. 21.6% of residents were under the age of 18; 5.9% were between the ages of 18 and 24; 20.2% were from 25 to 44; 29.5% were from 45 to 64; and 22.9% were 65 years of age or older. The gender makeup of the city was 50.0% male and 50.0% female.

2000 census
As of the census of 2000, there were 360 people, 152 households, and 100 families residing in the city. The racial makeup of the city was 98.33% White, 0.28% Native American, 0.83% from other races, and 0.56% from two or more races.

There were 152 households, out of which 24.3% had children under the age of 18 living with them, 55.9% were married couples living together, 7.9% had a female householder with no husband present, and 33.6% were non-families. 30.9% of all households were made up of individuals, and 13.8% had someone living alone who was 65 years of age or older.  The average household size was 2.37 and the average family size was 2.97.

In the city, the population was spread out, with 24.2% under the age of 18, 5.6% from 18 to 24, 20.3% from 25 to 44, 28.3% from 45 to 64, and 21.7% who were 65 years of age or older.  The median age was 45 years. For every 100 females, there were 96.7 males.  For every 100 females age 18 and over, there were 85.7 males.

The median income for a household in the city was $22,386, and the median income for a family was $31,111. Males had a median income of $25,000 versus $15,000 for females. The per capita income for the city was $14,475.  About 7.8% of families and 10.9% of the population were below the poverty line, including 12.9% of those under age 18 and 7.0% of those age 65 or over.

Notable people
 Herman Welker, former US Senator for Idaho

Transportation

Highways
 - US 95 
 - SH-71 
The city is served by U.S. Highway 95, connecting to Council and New Meadows to the north and Weiser and Payette to the south.  State Highway 71 heads northwest from Cambridge to the Brownlee Dam on the Snake River.

References

External links

Cambridge Commercial Club
Cambridge School District #432

Cities in Idaho
Cities in Washington County, Idaho